The Revival of the Fittest EP is the second and final extended play by the American Christian screamo band Aftereight.  It was independently released on September 18, 2007.  The EP is no longer available digitally, and is also out of print.

The EP served as a bridging release of the band's genre transition from screamo to their newly found pop rock sound.  Ultimately, this would lead the band to change their name to Capital Lights the next year, as a sign of their new direction.

It is also the release to spark the attention of Tooth & Nail Records, and what eventually led to the band signing with the label.

Background
Bryson Phillips later told Tulsa World, after the release, that he considered this the band's first professional release, stating that they previously "just burned discs to give away and sell at shows. There was nothing professional about it whatsoever."

Critical reception
Though reception was small, the release garnered high praise from the few music sites that did review it.

JJ Francesco of New Release Tuesday praised the EP immensely saying: "This album is a nice treat if you can somehow find it. The rock is good and it's interesting to hear what the poppy rock Capital Lights sounds up with the energy amped up a bit."  Preston Tucker of Jesus Freak Hideout plainly stated: "Overall, this album is very solid. In fact, it would be a grave mistake for any power pop / rock fan to turn this one down."

Track listing

Personnel
Aftereight
Bryson Phillips - lead vocals, bass
Brett Admire - guitar
Jonathan Williams - guitar
Michael Phillips - drums

Notes
The tracks "Worth as Much as a Counterfeit Dollar", "The Night of Your Life is When You Die", and "Can I Get an Amen!" are all re-recorded for the band's next album This Is an Outrage!.

References

2007 EPs
Capital Lights albums
Christian rock EPs